Micro Users Software Exchange, Inc., doing business as Muse Software, was an American video game developer based in Baltimore, Maryland, focusing on the development of games for the first generation of home computers. The company began with developing games for Apple II, and later expanded to the Commodore 64, Atari 8-bit family, and DOS. They are best known for creating the Wolfenstein series, having developed the first two installments: 1981's Castle Wolfenstein and its 1984 sequel, Beyond Castle Wolfenstein. The brand name lapsed and was used by id Software.

History 
Muse Software was incorporated by Ed Zaron on August 1, 1978, with Silas S. Warner becoming the first employee. Initially publishing games, the team also sold non-game software such as Super-Text, a word processor written by Zaron, and Appilot, a course-writing language written by Warner. Their original market was for the Apple II, with their first programs sold on cassettes, and later on floppy disks. They expanded their software offerings for the Atari 8-bit family and Commodore 64, plus ported both Castle Wolfenstein games to the IBM PC. The company also ran a retail store on the corner of Charles Street and Mulberry Street in Baltimore, called "Muse Software and Computer Center," which was closed down in 1982.

According to Zaron, the growth of Muse's sales was "extremely slow" because of a slump in the home computer software market. The company, which had about 40 employees at its peak in 1983, had shrunk down to just six prior to filing for Chapter 7 bankruptcy protection in 1985. Warner, who was leaving Muse to join MicroProse, said the company had difficulty setting up a sales program because of the long-term illness of a key sales employee. Muse Software was found to be in forfeiture on October 7, 1987.

In 1992, id Software released Wolfenstein 3D, based on Muse Software's Wolfenstein intellectual property. It brought the Wolfenstein brand to a much larger audience.

Games developed

References 

Companies that have filed for Chapter 7 bankruptcy
Defunct companies based in Baltimore
Defunct video game companies of the United States
Video game companies based in Maryland
Video game companies disestablished in 1987
Video game companies established in 1978
Video game development companies